No Stars in the Jungle is a 1967 Peruvian adventure drama film directed by Armando Robles Godoy. The film won the Golden Prize at the 5th Moscow International Film Festival in 1967. The film was also selected as the Peruvian entry for the Best Foreign Language Film at the 40th Academy Awards, but was not accepted as a nominee.

Cast
 Ignacio Quirós as Man
 Susana Pardahl as Woman
 Luisa Otero as Old Woman
 Jorge Montoro as Indian
 César David Miró as Kid
 Manuel Delorio as Landholder
 Jorge Aragón as Rubber Planter
 Demetrio Túpac Yupanqui as Commoner

See also
 List of submissions to the 40th Academy Awards for Best Foreign Language Film
 List of Peruvian submissions for the Academy Award for Best Foreign Language Film

References

External links
 

1967 films
1967 adventure films
1967 drama films
Peruvian adventure drama films
1960s Peruvian films
1960s Spanish-language films
Films directed by Armando Robles Godoy